Charity Kase is the stage name of Harry Whitfield, a drag performer most known for competing on the third series of RuPaul's Drag Race UK.

Early life
Whitfield was raised in Rufford, Lancashire. He enjoyed design and makeup as a child. During his teens, he explored his creativity by wearing costumes in Liverpool and Manchester.

Career

Charity Kase worked at the London club The Box, as of 2018.

Charity Kase competed on the third series of RuPaul's Drag Race UK. In 2021, BBC's Harvey Day said she was "firmly established as one of east London's edgiest drag queens - with a following of hundreds of thousands on Instagram." According to Day, "Charity is well-known for her extravagant, outrageous, over-the-top looks." Charity Kase partnered with Wildcat Gin in 2021 to promote a new flavor of gin.

Personal life
Charity Kase is a "drag daughter" of Raja, who won the third season of RuPaul's Drag Race in the United States. During her time on Drag Race UK, Charity Kase became the third contestant in Drag Race history, and the first from Drag Race UK, to reveal she was living with HIV, following Ongina and Trinity K. Bonet.

Whitfield is based in London.

Filmography

Television
 RuPaul's Drag Race UK (series 3)

References

External links
 
 
 

Year of birth missing (living people)
Living people
20th-century LGBT people
21st-century LGBT people
English drag queens
Gay entertainers
People from London
People from Rufford, Lancashire
People with HIV/AIDS
RuPaul's Drag Race UK contestants